Yousef Abu Laben (born 26 May 1992) is an Arab-Israeli footballer who currently plays at F.C. Dimona.

References

External links
 

1992 births
Living people
Arab-Israeli footballers
Arab citizens of Israel
Israeli footballers
Hapoel Be'er Sheva F.C. players
Hapoel Nir Ramat HaSharon F.C. players
Bnei Sakhnin F.C. players
Hapoel Ra'anana A.F.C. players
Hapoel Rishon LeZion F.C. players
Hapoel Bnei Lod F.C. players
Shimshon Kafr Qasim F.C. players
F.C. Dimona players
Israeli Premier League players
Liga Leumit players
Footballers from Beersheba
Association football forwards